Opsilia prasina is a species of beetle from the family Cerambycidae found in Armenia, Azerbaijan, and Iran.

References

Beetles described in 1971
prasina